Abdul Kadir Nuristani (born 1925) was an Afghan field hockey player who played in six matches at the 1948 Summer Olympic Games and the 1956 Summer Olympic Games.

References

External links
 

1925 births
Possibly living people
Olympic field hockey players of Afghanistan
Field hockey players at the 1948 Summer Olympics
Field hockey players at the 1956 Summer Olympics
Afghan male field hockey players
Place of birth missing